is a passenger railway station located in the city of Ōme, Tokyo, Japan, operated by the East Japan Railway Company (JR East).

Lines
Ishigamimae Station is served by the Ōme Line, located 22.4 kilometers from the terminus of the line at Tachikawa Station.

Station layout
This station consists of a single side platform serving a single bi-directional track. The station is unattended.

Platform

History
It was nationalized on 1 April 1944 and was renamed  at that time. It was renamed to its present name on 1 March 1947. It became part of the East Japan Railway Company (JR East) with the breakup of the Japanese National Railways in 1987.

Passenger statistics
In fiscal 2010, the station was used by an average of 504 passengers daily (boarding passengers only).

Surrounding area
 
 Tama River

See also
 List of railway stations in Japan

References

External links 

 JR East Station information (JR East) 

Railway stations in Tokyo
Ōme Line
Stations of East Japan Railway Company
Railway stations in Japan opened in 1928
Ōme, Tokyo